Murphy House is a heritage-listed former residence at 1 Marist Place, Parramatta, City of Parramatta, New South Wales, Australia. It was designed by James Whitmore Hill and built from 1904 by A. E. Gould. It is also known as St Patrick's Cathedral Presbytery and Murphy's House. It was added to the New South Wales State Heritage Register on 2 April 1999.

History 
It was built in 1904 as the presbytery for St Patrick's Cathedral, opening on 27 November that year. It was built at a cost of £1000. It replaced an earlier presbytery that was in poor condition and had been derided as "insanitary", and which had been blamed for the death of the parish priest from typhoid earlier that year. The new presbytery was dedicated to the late priest, Rev. Father P. B. Murphy. It subsequently became known as Murphy House.

It continues to be used for church purposes.

Heritage listing 
Murphy House was listed on the New South Wales State Heritage Register on 2 April 1999.

See also 

Australian residential architectural styles

References

Bibliography

Attribution

External links

New South Wales State Heritage Register
Houses in Parramatta
Federation style architecture
Articles incorporating text from the New South Wales State Heritage Register
1904 establishments in Australia
Houses completed in 1904
Roman Catholic Diocese of Parramatta
Buildings and structures of the Catholic Church in Australia